William Edward Parsons  (June 19, 1872 - December 17, 1939) was an architect and city planner known for his works in the Philippines during the early period of American colonization in the country. As the consulting architect to the Philippine government from 1905 to 1914, he designed various structures throughout the country, most notably the Gabaldon school building plans.

Biography
Parsons was born on June 1872 in Akron, Ohio. He was educated at Yale University and École des Beaux-Arts in Paris.

During the early years of the American colonial era in the Philippines, former Governor-General of the Philippines (and future U.S. president), Howard Taft favored a comprehensive building construction and city planning in the country. William Cameron Forbes, having recently appointed as commissioner to the Philippines, eventually sought out Daniel Burnham to create plans for developing the cities of Baguio and Manila. Burnham and fellow architect Pierce Anderson drew up general preliminary plans based from site surveys in 1904 and 1905, free of charge on Burnham's end. The plans were followed by a recommendation of a well-trained architect for the Government's plan, as Burnham ended his involvement on the plans in the Philippines.

Parsons was recommended by Burnham for the position, who at that time was practicing architecture in New York City, having recently graduated from École des Beaux-Arts, Paris. Parsons arrived at Manila in November 1905, tasked to "interpret" the preliminary plans prepared by Burnham and Anderson for Manila and Baguio, and modify these as needed. He would also supervise plans for building projects for the Bureau of Public Works. Several public buildings and parks designed by Parsons are a hybrid of colonial architecture and that of the Philippines, which is a tropical country. Such designs also adopted the use of local material, such as hardwoods and capiz shells for window sash in place of glass to reduce sunlight glare.

Parsons also prepared the standardized plans of the Gabaldon school buildings, which were designed akin to templates with the intent of promoting efficiency in the planning process. These are school buildings constructed in the Philippines between 1907 and 1946 and named after the late assemblyman Isauro Gabaldon of Nueva Ecija, who authored the Gabaldon Act which appropriated P1 million for the construction of modern public schools nationwide.

Parsons resigned in 1914, and he was succeeded by George Corner Fenhagen as the Consulting Architect of the Philippine government. He died on December 17, 1939, at his home in New Haven, Connecticut, survived by his wife and two children.

Works
Gabaldon School Buildings
Customs Office, Cebu City
Manila Army and Navy Club Building, Manila
Manila Elks Club, Manila
Manila Hotel, Manila
Paco railway station, Manila
Philippine General Hospital
H.A. Bordner Building, Manila Science High School
Philippine Normal School
Provincial Capitol (Old) of Laguna Province in Santa Cruz, Laguna
Provincial Capitol (Old) of Nueva Ecija in Cabanatuan
University Hall of the University of the Philippines Manila
The Mansion House, Baguio
Provincial Capitol (Old) of Capiz Province in Roxas City, Capiz
Casa Gobiyerno in Dumaguete
Rizal Old Capitol, Pasig

See also
Architecture of the Philippines

Notes

External links 

 William Edward Parsons papers at The Newberry
 Stanton, Schilling, and Parsons family papers at The Newberry

References  

19th-century American architects
American alumni of the École des Beaux-Arts
Yale University alumni
1872 births
1939 deaths
People from Akron, Ohio
Architects from Ohio